East Rowan High School is a public, co-educational secondary school located in Granite Quarry, North Carolina. It is one of seven high schools in the Rowan-Salisbury School System.

History
East Rowan High School was formed in 1959, from the consolidation of Rockwell High School and Granite Quarry High School.

School information
For the 2010–2011 school year, East Rowan High School had a total population of 1,110 students and 70.40 teachers on a (FTE) basis. For the student population, the gender ratio was 51.08% male to 48.92% female. The demographic group makeup of the student population was: White, 88.47%; Black, 6.22%; Hispanic, 2.79%; American Indian, 0.45%; and Asian/Pacific Islander, 0.81% (two or more races was 1.26%). For the same school year, 39.37% of the students received free and reduced-cost lunches.

Graduations are generally held at Catawba College's Keppel Auditorium.

Academics
East Rowan High School was rated a School of Distinction for the 2009–2010 and 2010–2011 school years on the North Carolina State Board of Education's yearly School Report Cards.

Athletics
East Rowan is a 3A school in the South Piedmont Conference. The school's mascot is the Mustangs, wearing the school colors of red and blue.

The East Rowan baseball team has had many successful years, winning two state 3A championships (1995, 2010), and being runner up in 2008.

Marching band competition
The school hosts the Mustang Classic, formerly known as the East Rowan-Food Lion Classic, a marching band competition inviting schools from around the North Carolina Piedmont. The event has been held annually every October since 1995.

Notable alumni
 Phil Kirk  former NC State Senator and former chairman of the North Carolina State Board of Education
 Bobby Parnell  Major League Baseball pitcher

References

External links

Public high schools in North Carolina
Educational institutions established in 1959
Schools in Rowan County, North Carolina
1959 establishments in North Carolina